Ipswich Borough Council, founded in 1974 after the abolition of the County Borough of Ipswich, governs the non-metropolitan district of Ipswich in Suffolk. It is the second tier of a two-tier system, fulfilling functions such as refuse collection, housing and planning, with Suffolk County Council providing county council services such as transport, education and social services.

Politics
Between 1979 and September 2004, Ipswich Borough Council was under Labour control. The town was then governed by a Conservative-Liberal Democrat coalition until May 2011 when it reverted to Labour.

The borough is covered by two parliamentary constituencies: Ipswich, which covers about 75% and is represented by Conservative MP Tom Hunt, and Central Suffolk & North Ipswich, which covers the remaining 25% and is represented by Conservative MP Dan Poulter.

Bid for unitary status
In April 2006 the council initiated public discussions about the idea of turning the borough into a unitary authority (Ipswich had constituted a county borough from 1889 to 1974, independent of the surrounding administrative county of East Suffolk, and this status was not restored by the Banham/Cooksey Commission in the 1990s). Ipswich, Norwich, Exeter and Oxford united to campaign for unitary authority status, hoping to use the window of opportunity presented by the October 2006 Local Government White Paper. In March 2007, it was announced that Ipswich was one of sixteen shortlisted councils and on 25 July 2007, the Secretary of state announced that she was minded to implement the unitary proposal for Ipswich, but that there were 'a number of risks relating to the financial case set out in the proposal', on which she invited Ipswich to undertake further work before a final decision is taken. Early in December plans were thrown into doubt as the Government announced that it had 'delayed' the unitary bids for Ipswich and Exeter. In July 2008 the Boundary Committee announced their preferred option was for a unitary authority covering Ipswich and the south-eastern corner of Suffolk (including Felixstowe).

Areas
The Council has divided the Borough into 5 areas which each have their own committee and funding.
 Central Area: Alexandra Ward, St Margaret’s Ward and Westgate Ward
 North East Area: Bixley Ward, Rushmere Ward and St John’s Ward
 North West Area: Castle Hill Ward, Whitehouse Ward and Whitton Ward
 South East Area: Gainsborough Ward, Holywells Ward and Priory Heath Ward
 South West Area: Bridge Ward, Gipping Ward, Sprites Ward and Stoke Park Ward

Wards
The Borough consists of 16 wards, each of which is represented by three Councillors. Since boundaries were revised in 2002 these have been:

For full election results see Ipswich Borough Council elections.

Heritage assets
Ipswich Borough Council owns a substantial of artworks which have been curated by the Colchester and Ipswich Museums Service since  2007.

Arms

References

 
Non-metropolitan district councils of England
Local authorities in Suffolk
Ipswich
 
Politics of Suffolk
Billing authorities in England